Louise Féron is a French rock singer. Her career started in 1988 with her first self-titled album Louise Féron. The album was produced by John Cale (ex-Velvet Underground) with music composed by Dominique Laboubée (leader of band Dogs), and participation of Les Wampas guitarist, Philippe Almosnino.

Discography 
 Louise Féron (1991, Virgin)
 Singulière et Plurielle (1997, L.P.G.)
 Le Passé Revenant (2010, Tarantula Music)

External links 
 Official site  

Living people
French women singers
Year of birth missing (living people)